Loren Rolland Babe (January 11, 1928 – February 14, 1984), nicknamed "Bee Bee", was an American professional baseball infielder, manager, scout and coach.

The native of Pisgah, Iowa, was signed by the New York Yankees in 1945 and was a longtime player and manager in the Bombers' minor league organization. During his two seasons in Major League Baseball, he played for the Yankees and the Philadelphia Athletics. He was traded back to the Yankees after the 1953 season but did not play another major league game. He registered 85 hits in 382 at bats, yielding a .223 batting average.

After his playing days were over, Babe worked as a minor league manager and Major League Baseball coach. During the mid-1960s, he managed the Toledo Mud Hens, who were at the time the Yankees' AAA affiliate. He was the Yankees' first base coach in 1967, on the staff of skipper Ralph Houk. In , while scouting for the Chicago White Sox, Babe was diagnosed with colon cancer. At the time, he needed 57 days of Major League service to become a vested member of the players' pension plan, which also provides health benefits. The ChiSox named Babe to their coaching staff to enable him to qualify. At the same time the White Sox had another coach, batting instructor Charley Lau, who was battling colon cancer. Babe and Lau both survived the 1983 season while undergoing cancer treatments. Babe died on February 14, 1984, at his home in Omaha, Nebraska. He was 56. Lau, 50, succumbed slightly over a month later, on March 18.

References

External links

1928 births
1984 deaths
Auburn Yankees players
Baseball players from Iowa
Beaumont Exporters players
Beaumont Roughnecks players
Binghamton Triplets players
Deaths from cancer in Nebraska
Chicago White Sox coaches
Chicago White Sox scouts
Deaths from colorectal cancer
Denver Bears players
Kansas City Blues (baseball) players
Major League Baseball first base coaches
Major League Baseball third basemen
Muskegon Clippers players
New York Yankees coaches
New York Yankees players
New York Yankees scouts
Norfolk Tars players
People from Harrison County, Iowa
Philadelphia Athletics players
Rochester Red Wings players
Seattle Rainiers players
Sportspeople from Omaha, Nebraska
Syracuse Chiefs managers
Syracuse Chiefs players
Toledo Mud Hens managers
Toronto Maple Leafs (International League) players